20 of the Best is a 1982 compilation album by country singer Willie Nelson.

Track listing 
"Funny How Time Slips Away"
"Night Life"
"My Own Peculiar Way"
"Hello Walls"
"Mr. Record Man"
"Family Bible"
"To Make a Long Story Short (She's Gone)"
"Good Times"
"She's Still Gone"
"Little Things"
"Pretty Paper"
"Bloody Mary Morning"
"What Can You Do to Me Now"
"December Day"
"Yesterday's Wine"
"Me and Paul"
"Good Hearted Woman"
"She's Not for You"
"It Should Be Easier Now"
"Phases and Stages"

Personnel 
Willie Nelson – Guitar, vocals

References

1982 greatest hits albums
Willie Nelson compilation albums
RCA Records compilation albums